James or Jimmy Dykes may refer to:
James Oswald Dykes (1835–1912), Scottish clergyman
Jimmy Dykes (1896–1976), American baseball player and manager
Jimmy Dykes (basketball) (born 1961), American basketball commentator and coach
Jimmy Dykes (Scottish footballer) (1916–1974), Scottish footballer
Jimmy Dykes (Irish footballer) (1898–1976), Irish footballer
Jimmy Dykes (rugby union), Scottish international rugby union player
Jimmy Lee Dykes, perpetrator of the 2013 Alabama bunker hostage crisis